Minecraft is a 2011 sandbox video game.

Minecraft may also refer to:

Video games
 Minecraft (franchise), a video game franchise based around the game
 Minecraft Earth, an augmented reality sandbox mobile game
 Minecraft Dungeons, a dungeon crawler game for PC
 Minecraft: Story Mode, a 2015–2016 point-and-click graphic adventure video game developed by Telltale Games
 Minecraft Legends, an upcoming action-strategy video game set to be released in 2023, developed by Mojang Studios and Blackbird Interactive

Other uses
 Music of Minecraft, the soundtrack to Minecraft
 Lego Minecraft, Lego figures that are based on Minecraft characters, blocks, and more
 Minecraft: The Story of Mojang, a 2012 documentary about Minecraft and its developer Mojang
 Minecraft (book), a 2013 book about Minecraft and its creator Markus "Notch" Persson
 Minecraft, Pacific Fleet, U.S. Navy

See also
 Minecraft modding, a modification of the base Minecraft game